Guido Bünstorf (born 10 October 1968) is professor of Economics at the University of Kassel and head of the Economic Policy Research Group. Since 2010 he is also co-director of International Center for Higher Education  Research (INCHER-Kassel). He has been research Professor at Leibniz Institute of Economic Research Halle (IWH) since 2012 and a visiting professor at the University of Aalborg since 2013.

Career 
Bünstorf studied economics and political science at the University of Freiburg and University of Massachusetts at Amherst. He earned his Diploma in Economics at the University of Freiburg in 1996. He obtained his doctoral degree in 2002. He was Visiting Researcher in the Department of Social and Decision Sciences, Carnegie Mellon University, Pittsburgh (U.S.A.) from 2002 to 2003. He habilitated in 2008 at the University of Jena, and was Research Group Leader in the Max Planck Institute of Economics, Jena from 2008 to 2009.

Publications
 How useful is generalized Darwinism as a framework to study competition and industrial evolution?, Journal of Evolutionary Economics, 16 (2006): 511-527.
 Evolution on the shoulders of giants: entrepreneurship and firm survival in the German laser industry, Review of Industrial Organization, 30 (2007): 179-202.
 Can sustainable consumption be learned? A model of cultural evolution, Ecological Economics, 67 (2008): 646-657. (with C. Codes)
 Heritage and agglomeration: the Akron tyre cluster revisited, The Economic Journal, 119 (2009): 705-733 (with S. Klepper)
 Is commercialization good or bad for science? Individual-level evidence from the Max Planck Society, Research Policy, 38 (2009): 281-292.
 B2C - Bubble to cluster: The dot.com boom, spin-off entrepreneurship, and regional agglomeration, Journal of Evolutionary Economics, 19 (2009): 349- 378.
 The Economics of Energy and the Production Process: An Evolutionary Approach. Cheltenham: Edward Elgar, 2004.

Awards 
 Stephan Schrader Award 2010 – Munich Best Paper Award Entrepreneurship Research; Ludwig- Maximilians-Universität München and Technische Universität München.
 Best Habilitation Award 2009, Friedrich Schiller University Jena
  K. William Kapp Prize 2006; European Association for Evolutionary Political Economy
 Otto Hahn Medal 2003, Max Planck Society for the Advancement of Science

References 

1968 births
Living people